Mocuba is a city and seat of Mocuba District of Zambezia Province in Mozambique. It is located on the Licungo River.

Demographics

See also 

 Railways in Mozambique
 Railway stations in Mozambique

References 

Populated places in Zambezia Province